Snezhko (from снег meaning snow) is a gender-neutral Slavic surname. Notable people with the surname include:

Alexandra Snezhko-Blotskaya (1909–1980), Russian animated films director

Slavic-language surnames